Il ragazzo che sorride (Italian for The boy who smiles) is a 1969 Italian "musicarello" film directed by Aldo Grimaldi and starring Al Bano and Susanna Martinková.

Cast 

 Al Bano as Giorgio
 Susanna Martinková as Livia
 Rocky Roberts as himself
 Nino Taranto as Filippo Leccisi former professor 
 Antonella Steni as Tilde, Filippo's wife 
 Yvonne Sanson as Livia's mother
 Riccardo Garrone as Livia's father
 Francesco Mulé as Undertaker's establishment owner
 Franco Ressel as Mine owner  
 Fiorenzo Fiorentini as House-painter 
 Franco Scandurra as Scandini 
 Giacomo Furia as Barman
 Umberto Raho as Dr. Scholler
 Ignazio Balsamo as Assistant of engineer 
 Carlo Taranto as Hotel concierge
 Nino Terzo as Male nurse

Locations

Entire shooting in Rome and even in Rome Cavalieri Hilton, location very often used in italians movies in decade '60-'70, the plot have request a fake Kenian set in a mine gallery.

References

External links

Musicarelli
1969 musical comedy films
Films directed by Aldo Grimaldi
Films scored by Carlo Rustichelli
1969 films
1960s Italian-language films
1960s Italian films